Jeffrey Michael Jordan (born November 18, 1988) is an American former basketball player who played for the University of Illinois and the University of Central Florida. He is the oldest child of retired Hall of Fame basketball player Michael Jordan. Jeffrey Jordan is the co-founder of Heir Jordan, a philanthropic foundation that he runs with his younger brother Marcus.

High school
Jeffrey Jordan was the subject of local and national media attention as a high schooler, and had three of his high school games shown nationally on ESPN in 2007. At Loyola, he was a starter for three years and was All-Catholic League twice. He was chosen for the 2007 Jordan Brand Classic.

Jordan also played football in his tenth-grade year.

College
Jordan graduated from Loyola Academy on May 26, 2007. He received scholarship offers from Valparaiso and Loyola University Chicago, and was actively recruited as a preferred walk-on by Davidson, Penn State, Northwestern, and University of Illinois. Jordan decided to play as a preferred walk-on at the University of Illinois and enrolled at the university in 2007 as a psychology major with an academic scholarship. On January 22, 2009, it was announced by the university that Jordan would receive a full athletic scholarship.

On June 24, 2009, Jordan announced he was leaving the University of Illinois’ basketball team to focus on school and his "life after basketball". During the summer of 2009, he interned at Nike. Jordan later decided to return to the team, but after the 2009–10 season, he received a release to transfer to the University of Central Florida alongside his brother, Marcus.

In January 2012, Jordan left the UCF team for "personal reasons".

Personal life
Jordan is the eldest child of Michael Jordan and his first wife, Juanita Vanoy, who married when Jeffrey was an infant and divorced when he was in high school, sharing custody of Jeffrey and siblings Marcus and Jasmine. Through his father's second wife he has twin half-sisters, Ysabel and Victoria.

Jordan lives in Portland, Oregon, where he entered Nike Inc.'s management-training program after college. In 2020, he co-founded the Jordan Avakian Group, a Chicago-based consultant group.

Jordan married Radina Aneva in May 2019.

On September 24, 2021, Jordan was arrested in Scottsdale, Arizona for assaulting hospital staff.

In popular culture
In the 1996 film Space Jam, which starred Michael Jordan as himself, Jeffrey Jordan was portrayed by Manner Washington.

References

External links
 Jeff Jordan's profile at University of Illinois Athletics
 Illinibasketballhistory.com

1988 births
Living people
African-American basketball players
American men's basketball players
Basketball players from Chicago
Basketball players from Portland, Oregon
Illinois Fighting Illini men's basketball players
People from Highland Park, Illinois
Point guards
UCF Knights men's basketball players